Capuzzo is an Italian surname. Notable people with the surname include:

Adriano Capuzzo (1927–2011), Italian equestrian
Michael Capuzzo (born 1957), American journalist and writer
Oreste Capuzzo (1908–1985), Italian gymnast

See also
Fort Capuzzo, a World War II fort in Italian Libya

Italian-language surnames